The Jegihorn is a mountain of the Swiss Pennine Alps, overlooking Saas-Balen in the canton of Valais. It is located west of the Lagginhorn.

See also
 Tom Bourdillon#Mountaineer

References

External links

Jegihorn on Hikr

Mountains of the Alps
Alpine three-thousanders
Mountains of Switzerland
Mountains of Valais